This is a list of radio stations in Macau.

Rádio Macau
 Rádio Macau in Cantonese (FM 100.7 MHz)
 Rádio Macau in Portuguese (FM 98.0 MHz)
Radio Vilaverde Lda
 FM 99.5 (FM 99.5 MHz)

See also
Media in Macau 
List of radio stations in Hong Kong

Macau
Radio